American Born is a 1913 American drama silent short film starring Sydney Ayres, Harry Van Meter, Charles Cummings, Jacques Jaccard, Louise Lester, Charles Morrison, Jack Richardson and Vivian Rich.

External links

1913 films
American silent short films
American black-and-white films
1913 drama films
Silent American drama films
Films directed by Lorimer Johnston
1910s American films